Finally Karen   is the debut solo album of gospel singer Karen Clark Sheard of The Clark Sisters, released on November 4, 1997. The live portion of the album was recorded at Bailey Cathedral in Detroit, Michigan. The album was Grammy-nominated for Best Contemporary R&B Gospel Album in 1998. The song "The Will of God" launched the gospel career of her daughter Kierra "Kiki" Sheard, who won her first Stellar award from the strength of her vocal performance. Finally Karen also won the Lady Of Soul award for Best Gospel Album the same year.

Track listing

 "Just For Me" - 4:39
 "Nothing Without You (featuring Faith Evans)" - 4:52
 "Praise Festival" - 3:48
 "Unconditional (Mad Love)" - 4:37
 "Gotta Right..." - 4:15
 "Can't Take It" - 4:25
 "Jesus Is A Love Song (featuring The Clark Sisters)" - 6:38
 "Jesus Is A Love Song (reprise)" - 2:56
 "Balm In Gilead" - 6:33
 "Holy, Thou Art Holy" - 7:42
 "Heaven (featuring Donald Lawrence)" - 4:18
 "Couldn't Tell It If I Tried" - 7:16
 "A Praying Spirit" - 7:05
 "The Will Of God (featuring Kierra Sheard)" - 5:03

Charts

Weekly charts

Year-end charts

References

Karen Clark Sheard albums
1997 debut albums